The 1995–96 Vysshaya Liga season was the fourth season of the Vysshaya Liga, the second level of ice hockey in Russia. 57 teams participated in the first round. SKA Khabarovsk and Dizelist Penza were promoted to the International Hockey League.

First round

Central-1

Central-2

Northwest

Volga

Ural-North

Ural-South

Siberia - Far East

Final round

Central, Volga, Northwest

Ural, West Siberia

Siberian Far-Eastern

Playoffs

Placing round 

5th-8th place
 Ermak Angarsk - Metallurg Achinsk 3:2, 5:1, 3:2, 4:2, 5:0
 Shakhtyor Prokopyevsk - Motor Barnaul 2:3, 3:0, 2:0, 2:0, 5:0

5th place
 Shakhtor Prokopyevsk - Ermak Angarsk 3:2, 4:2, 5:4

7th place
 Motor Barnaul - Metallurg Achinsk 5:3, 6:4, 2:1

Promotion round

External links 
 Season on hockeyarchives.info
 Season on hockeyarchives.ru

Russian Major League seasons
2
1995–96 in European second tier ice hockey leagues